Coffee milk is a drink made by mixing coffee syrup or extract with milk, in a manner similar to chocolate milk. Since 1993, it has been the official state drink of the U.S. state of Rhode Island.

History
While the precise origin of coffee milk is unclear, several sources trace it back to the 19th century Italian immigrant population in Providence, Rhode Island. In the late 19th and early 20th centuries, approximately 55,000 Italian immigrants traveled to Providence, introducing their traditions and customs to Rhode Island; this included drinking sweetened coffee with milk, which is believed to have led to the creation of coffee milk.

Coffee milk originated in American diners and soda fountains in the early 20th century. The first coffee syrup is thought to have been created by a soda fountain operator who sweetened leftover coffee grounds with milk and sugar to create a syrup, then mixed it into glasses of milk. In the 1930s, coffee milk was regularly served at pharmacy lunch counters, targeted toward children and youth as an alternative to the hot coffee served to their parents.

Due to the popularity of the product, coffee syrup was eventually bottled and sold by merchants. The first mass-produced coffee syrup was introduced by the Silmo Packing Company of New Bedford, Massachusetts, in 1932. In 1938, Warwick, Rhode Island-based Eclipse Food Products began heavily promoting its own coffee syrup product, with Lincoln, Rhode Island's Autocrat Coffee coming to market in the 1940s. Autocrat purchased long-time competitor Eclipse in 1991 and today produces both brands of syrup. Autocrat is claimed to be the most popular brand of coffee syrup in Rhode Island. Newer brands such as Dave's Coffee and Morning Glory offer coffee syrups with desired customer qualities, such as no high-fructose corn syrup or artificial colors.

In 1993, the Rhode Island General Assembly opted to change Rhode Island's state drink, with the two potential choices being coffee milk and Del's Lemonade. Coffee milk ultimately triumphed, and was officially named the state drink on July 29, 1993.

Coffee syrup 

Coffee syrup is a sweetened coffee concentrate and is a key ingredient in coffee milk.

Coffee syrup is produced by straining hot water and sugar through coffee grounds. It can also be prepared by preparing a large amount of hot coffee and then adding sugar to it afterward. A cold-process method for coffee syrup involves soaking pulverized coffee beans for some time and then adding sugar.

Coffee syrup is often brewed at home, in a saucepan using coffee and sugar.

Related foods
A coffee cabinet is an ice cream-based milkshake-style beverage found almost exclusively in Rhode Island and southeastern Massachusetts, consisting of coffee ice cream, coffee syrup, and milk.

In December 2013, the Narragansett Brewing Company partnered with Autocrat Coffee to market a limited edition "coffee milk stout".

In summer 2015, Warwick Ice Cream cooperated with Autocrat to produce coffee milk ice cream.

See also

 Camp Coffee
 Coffee sauce
 Egg cream
 Farmers Union Iced Coffee
 Iced coffee
 List of coffee beverages
 List of regional beverages of the United States

References

Further reading
 
 Brown, Seth (2007). Rhode Island Curiosities. Globe Pequot. p. 130. 

Flavored milk
Italian-American culture in Providence, Rhode Island
Symbols of Rhode Island
Rhode Island cuisine
New England cuisine
Coffee derivatives